Aid to Southeast Asia (ASA) is a humanitarian organization, providing help for the countries of Southeast Asia (mainly, Vietnam) on a people-to-people basis, aiming to strengthen world peace and respect for human rights. It was established in 1989 by US veterans of the war with Vietnam to provide humanitarian aid and medical equipment and supplies to Vietnam. The organization is based in the United States.

In 1997 ASA helped to organize relief after Typhoon Linda. It later provided dental equipment and 8,000 pairs of eyeglasses in 1998. In 1999, ASA gave financial aid to HIV prevention programs.

Volunteer medical expert groups from the United States often visit and help Vietnamese health facilities through the efforts of ASA. The organization receives funding from the Combined Federal Campaign (CFC) and individual donors, as well as some corporate funding.

In recent years, the organization supplied medical equipment, including operating tables, exam tables, operating room lights, beds, stethoscopes, syringes, mammogram machines, incubators and X-ray machines, which went to Ninh Binh and Ha Nam provinces of Vietnam.

References

Organizations established in 1989
Health charities in the United States
Foreign charities operating in Vietnam